Geestequelle is a Samtgemeinde ("collective municipality") in the district of Rotenburg, in Lower Saxony, Germany. It is situated west of Bremervörde, and approx. 50 km northeast of Bremen. It is named after the source (German: Quelle) of the small river Geeste. Its seat is in Oerel.

The Samtgemeinde Geestequelle consists of the following municipalities:

 Alfstedt
 Basdahl
 Ebersdorf
 Hipstedt
 Oerel

Samtgemeinden in Lower Saxony